Cucochodaeus is a genus of sand-loving scarab beetles in the family Ochodaeidae containing one described species, C. sparsus.

References

Further reading

 
 

Scarabaeoidea genera
Monotypic Scarabaeiformia genera
Articles created by Qbugbot